Helianthemum guerrae is a species of plant in the family Cistaceae. It is endemic to Spain.  Its natural habitat is Mediterranean Matorral shrubland vegetation. It is threatened by habitat loss.

References

guerrae
Endemic flora of Spain
Endemic flora of the Iberian Peninsula
Matorral shrubland
Endangered plants
Endangered biota of Europe
Taxonomy articles created by Polbot